Alucita idiocrossa is a moth of the family Alucitidae. It is found on Java.

References

Moths described in 1936
Alucitidae
Moths of Indonesia
Taxa named by Edward Meyrick